Celiptera remigioides is a moth of the family Erebidae. It is found from Mexico (Veracruz) to Brazil, Ecuador and the Galapagos Islands.

References

Moths described in 1852
Celiptera